Javier Gómez may refer to:

 Francisco Javier Gómez Noya (born 1983), Galician triathlete
 Javier Gómez Cifuentes (born 1981), Spanish footballer
 Javier Gómez Darmendrail (born 1949), Spanish politician with the People's Party
 Javier Gómez Fuertes (born 1986), Spanish gymnast
 Javier Gómez (cyclist) (born 1991), Colombian cyclist
 Javier Gómez (actor) (born 1960), Argentine television actor